The Otún River (Río Otún) is a river in the Risaralda department of Colombia.  Its source is Lake Otún, fed by meltwater from Nevado Santa Isabel, and its outlet is the Cauca River.  The Otún River passes between the cities of Pereira and Dosquebradas, and is crossed at that point by the César Gaviria Trujillo Viaduct, one of the largest cable-stayed bridges in South America.

The Otún River is the only source of drinking water for Pereira and Dosquebradas. Agricultural development in that region has affected the quality of the water from the river, with pig and chicken farms as well as human waste water being major sources of bacteriological contamination.

The river passes through several protected zones including the Otún Quimbaya Flora and Fauna Sanctuary.

Notes
 Trejos Gómez et al. (2003).

References
Trejos Gómez et al. (2003), "Estrategias para disminuir la contaminacion por organismos bacterianos patogenos, en la fuente abastecedora de agua del acueducto de la ciudad de Pereira", Scientia et Technica, No. 23, 87–92. 

Universidad Central (2003), "Plan de saneamiento hídrico de Pereira".  

Rivers of Colombia
Geography of Risaralda Department
Pereira, Colombia